State Trunk Highway 113 (often called Highway 113, STH-113 or WIS 113) is a state highway in the U.S. state of Wisconsin. It runs in north–south in south central Wisconsin from Madison to Baraboo, The highway uses the Merrimac Ferry, the last ferry in the Wisconsin state highway system, to cross the Wisconsin River at Merrimac. Over the length of the road, it runs through Dane, Columbia, and Sauk counties.

Route description

WIS 113 starts at an intersection with US Highway 151 in Madison. It runs northward as a divided highway through the northeast side of Madison and around the northern shore of Lake Mendota before crossing the Yahara River and exiting the city into the town of Westport. East of the
village of Waunakee, the highway turns westward and runs concurrently along WIS 19 for about  into the village. In the center of the village, WIS 113 turns northward and separates from WIS 19. From there, it turns westward to pass through the village of Dane and turns northward crossing out of Dane County into Columbia County on the way to Lodi.

In Lodi, the highway intersects WIS 60. WIS 113 continues north-northwesterly through the town of Lodi along the shore of Lake Wisconsin. Across the lake from Merrimac, the highway meets the northern end of WIS 188 and turns north into the parking area for the Merrimac Ferry. WIS 113 uses the ferry to cross Lake Wisconsin and into Sauk County.

Immediately north of the ferry crossing, WIS 113 turns westward and runs concurrently with WIS 78 through Merrimac. West of the village, WIS 113 turns northward. The highway crosses the Baraboo River and turns westerly into the city of Baraboo. After passing the Circus World Museum, WIS 113 turns northward. It then runs for about  before it terminates at an intersection with WIS 33.

History
In 2001, much of the portion between Waunakee and Dane was rerouted. The routing was moved because the original alignment had several tight curves that had to be navigated at a low speed, whereas the new alignment was entirely straight with no curves. The old roadway was returned to the town of Vienna and was renamed Old 113 Road.

Major intersections

See also

References

External links

Highway 113 at Wisconsin Highways

113
Transportation in Dane County, Wisconsin
Transportation in Columbia County, Wisconsin
Transportation in Sauk County, Wisconsin